Manor House Publishing Incorporated is a small Canadian publishing company, established in 1998 and based in the Ancaster neighborhood of Hamilton Ontario.

History and operations
It publishes mostly in soft-cover books by Canadian authors, many previously unpublished. These books vary in subjects, including non-fiction, fiction, biography, business, New Age and poetry.

Notable authors
 Ian Thomas Bequest (2006; fiction);  The Lost Chord (2008; fiction)
 Pat MacAdam Gold Medal "Misfits" How the Unwanted 1948 Flyers Scored Olympic Glory (2007; non-fiction); Mulroney's Man

See also 

 Canadian literature
 Culture of Hamilton, Ontario
 List of English-language book publishing companies
 List of head offices in Hamilton, Ontario

References 

  Chiodo, Suzi. (August 24, 2007). "Two Minute Job Shadows: Manor House Publishing". The Hamilton Spectator.
 Bridges, Holly. (November 30, 2007). "One's a Mystery, One's a Miracle". Royal Canadian Air Force.  Retrieved March 7, 2013.
  Ian Thomas Biography.  Ian Thomas.

External links
 , the company's official website

1998 establishments in Ontario
Book publishing companies of Canada
Companies based in Hamilton, Ontario
Culture of Hamilton, Ontario
Publishing companies established in 1998
Canadian companies established in 1998